Hudson is a city in Lenawee County in the U.S. state of Michigan. The population was 2,307 at the 2010 census. The city is mostly surrounded by Hudson Township, but the two are administered autonomously.

History
Hudson was named for Dr. Daniel Hudson, an original landowner. The city's motto is "Small Town Big Heart."

Geography

Major highways
 runs through downtown Hudson.
 intersects M-34 on the western border.

Demographics

2010 census
As of the census of 2010, there were 2,307 people, 861 households, and 599 families residing in the city. The racial makeup of the city was 96.2% White, 0.7% African American, 0.5% Native American, 0.3% Asian, 0.3% from other races, and 1.9% from two or more races. Hispanic or Latino of any race were 4.2% of the population.

There were 861 households, of which 40.3% had children under the age of 18 living with them, 48.7% were married couples living together, 15.6% had a female householder with no husband present, 5.3% had a male householder with no wife present, and 30.4% were non-families. 27.1% of all households were made up of individuals, and 9.2% had someone living alone who was 65 years of age or older. The average household size was 2.63 and the average family size was 3.16.

The median age in the city was 33.4 years. 29.5% of residents were under the age of 18; 9.2% were between the ages of 18 and 24; 25.7% were from 25 to 44; 25% were from 45 to 64; and 10.7% were 65 years of age or older. The gender makeup of the city was 49.0% male and 51.0% female.

2000 census
The racial makeup of the city was 96.28% White, 0.32% African American, 0.20% Native American, 0.64% Asian, 0.84% from other races, and 1.72% from two or more races. Hispanic or Latino of any race were 2.16% of the population.

There were 929 households, out of which 38.9% had children under the age of 18 living with them, 52.6% were married couples living together, 14.1% had a female householder with no husband present, and 29.9% were non-families. 24.1% of all households were made up of individuals, and 10.1% had someone living alone who was 65 years of age or older.  The average household size was 2.65 and the average family size was 3.15.

In the city, the population was spread out, with 29.7% under the age of 18, 9.4% from 18 to 24, 30.8% from 25 to 44, 19.2% from 45 to 64, and 10.9% who were 65 years of age or older.  The median age was 32 years. For every 100 females, there were 91.9 males.  For every 100 females age 18 and over, there were 84.4 males.

The median income for a household in the city was $41,122, and the median income for a family was $43,011. Males had a median income of $32,946 versus $23,679 for females. The per capita income for the city was $16,340.  About 4.9% of families and 8.0% of the population were below the poverty line, including 8.2% of those under age 18 and 7.2% of those age 65 or over.

Media

Newspaper
Hudson Post-Gazette

Radio
WBZV 102.5FM

Notable people
 Will Carleton, poet
 Bessie Boies Cotton, YMCA worker in Russia 1917-1919
 Edna Boies Hopkins, artist

References

External links
Official site

Cities in Lenawee County, Michigan
Populated places established in 1833
1833 establishments in Michigan Territory